Ghislaine Landry (born April 27, 1988) is a Canadian rugby union player. She won a gold medal at the 2015 Pan American Games as a member of the Canadian women's rugby sevens team. During the 2016-17 season, Landry succeeded Jen Kish as captain of the national sevens. On 20 October 2018, Landry became the first woman to hit the 1,000 point milestone in the women's sevens World Series.

In 2016, Landry was named to Canada's first ever women's rugby sevens Olympic team, which won the bronze medal in a match against Great Britain. In 2017, Landry moved into first place all-time in HSBC World Rugby Women's Sevens Series scoring with 706 points. In June 2021, Landry was named to Canada's 2020 Summer Olympics team.

Landry attended Saint Francis Xavier University.

She came out as homosexual in 2006 and married her partner in 2018.

Achievements and honours 
2013, Canada, Sevens Silver medallist at Rugby World Cup Sevens.
2016, Canada, Sevens Bronze medallist at Rio Olympic Games.
 2017, Canada Sevens Langford dream team.
 2018, Canada, Sevens Captain of Canadian Rugby World Cup Sevens team.

References

External links
 Ghislaine Landry at Rugby Canada
 
 
 
 

1988 births
Living people
Canadian female rugby union players
Sportspeople from Toronto
Rugby sevens players at the 2015 Pan American Games
Pan American Games gold medalists for Canada
Rugby sevens players at the 2016 Summer Olympics
Olympic rugby sevens players of Canada
Canada international rugby sevens players
Female rugby sevens players
Olympic bronze medalists for Canada
Olympic medalists in rugby sevens
Medalists at the 2016 Summer Olympics
Pan American Games medalists in rugby sevens
Medalists at the 2015 Pan American Games
Lesbian sportswomen
LGBT rugby union players
Canadian LGBT sportspeople
Rugby sevens players at the 2020 Summer Olympics
Canada international women's rugby sevens players